Shannon is a small town in the Horowhenua District of New Zealand's North Island. it is located 28 kilometres southwest of Palmerston North and 15 kilometres northeast of Levin.

The main activities in the district are dairy, sheep, and mixed farming. Mangaore (5 kilometres east) is the residential township for the nearby Mangahao hydro-electric power station, which was the second power station to be built in New Zealand and the first to be built by the government. The power station is the oldest still supplying power to New Zealand grid. The Manawatu River lies to the west of the town.

A large percentage of the population is Māori with the local primary school representing kaupapa Māori.

History

Shannon originally adjoined extensive swamps and was a headquarters for flax milling. The land on which the township later stood was part of an endowment of  acquired about 1881 by the Wellington and Manawatu Railway Company (WMR). At first the company had intended to extend its railway from Levin to Foxton, but afterwards it proceeded to develop and open up the endowment area. Accordingly, the line was laid along the present route via Shannon. The town is considered to have been founded on 8 March 1887 when the first auction of town land was held. Shannon was named after George Vance Shannon (1842–1920), a director of the WMR. It was constituted a borough in 1917.

Mangahao Power Station tragedy

On 2 July 1922 seven workers were poisoned by carbon monoxide while digging the tunnels for the Mangahao Power Station.

When the extractor fan broke down, Bernard Butler and foreman Alfred Maxwell were killed by suffocation from the fumes being emitted by their oil engines.  A subsequent search party of five of their colleagues also suffocated and perished in the tunnel.

Demographics

Shannon had a population of 1,398 at the 2018 New Zealand census, an increase of 162 people (13.1%) since the 2013 census, and an increase of 36 people (2.6%) since the 2006 census. There were 537 households. There were 681 males and 720 females, giving a sex ratio of 0.95 males per female. The median age was 40.4 years (compared with 37.4 years nationally), with 291 people (20.8%) aged under 15 years, 261 (18.7%) aged 15 to 29, 630 (45.1%) aged 30 to 64, and 216 (15.5%) aged 65 or older.

Ethnicities were 78.5% European/Pākehā, 43.1% Māori, 2.8% Pacific peoples, 1.7% Asian, and 1.3% other ethnicities (totals add to more than 100% since people could identify with multiple ethnicities).

The proportion of people born overseas was 7.3%, compared with 27.1% nationally.

Although some people objected to giving their religion, 53.6% had no religion, 30.9% were Christian, 0.9% were Buddhist and 4.1% had other religions.

Of those at least 15 years old, 87 (7.9%) people had a bachelor or higher degree, and 393 (35.5%) people had no formal qualifications. The median income was $21,300, compared with $31,800 nationally. The employment status of those at least 15 was that 405 (36.6%) people were employed full-time, 153 (13.8%) were part-time, and 84 (7.6%) were unemployed.

Town facilities and attractions

Today Shannon sits as a passing through point between Palmerston North, the Horowhenua, Kapiti and Wellington with two cafes, a dairy, an RD1 rural supply store, a fish and chip shop, a primary school, a Four Square grocer, a petrol station and an art gallery.

The township has rugby, netball and lawn bowling clubs.

Shannon Railway Station is the most substantial of only a few remaining physical relics of the WMR, which was acquired by the national New Zealand Railways Department in 1908. The station is a stop for the Capital Connection long distance commuter train between Wellington and Palmerston North.

Owlcatraz
Owlcatraz was a native bird and wildlife park and one of Shannon's prime attractions. It was opened in 1997 by Ross & Janet Campbell and operated by them until it was sold 23 years later. Owlcatraz had over one million visitors in that time.

Helen's town / Flaxville
The town used to house the creative work of Helen Pratt which consisted of a large model town with miniature versions of many New Zealand landmarks and buildings, a working train and carnival, all hand made. The display used to be housed at 36 Stout Street until the building was closed in the 1990s.

Helen subsequently built another town. Helen's collection was shown to the public for brief period of time known as Flaxville at 16 Ballance Street. Helen's Collection has left Shannon and was later displayed at Murrayfield, a museum between Shannon and Levin on State 57.

Education

References

External links
Shannon etc in NZHistory.net
Shannon in the 1897 Cyclopaedia of New Zealand
Shannon war memorial
South African War memorial in Shannon

Populated places in Manawatū-Whanganui
Horowhenua District